The 2023 DC Defenders season is the second season for the DC Defenders as a professional American football franchise. The Defenders will play their home games at Audi Field and will be led by head coach Reggie Barlow.

At the first home game security staff prevented fans building the "Beer Snake", a signature feature from the 2020 season, and fans started throwing lemons on the field. The league made the proper arrangements for the "Beer Snake" to be allowed during Defenders home games.

Background 

The 2020 season was the inaugural season for the DC Defenders as a professional club. They were playing as charter members of the rebooted XFL, one of eight teams to compete in the league for the season. The Defenders played their home games at Audi Field and were led by head coach Pep Hamilton.

Their inaugural season was cut short due to the COVID-19 pandemic and the XFL officially suspended operations for the remainder of the season on March 20, 2020. The Defenders finished the season with a 3–2 record.

Schedule
All times Eastern

Game Summaries

Week 1: vs. Seattle Sea Dragons

Week 2: at Vegas Vipers

Week 3: vs. St. Louis BattleHawks

Week 4: vs. Vegas Vipers

Week 5: at St. Louis BattleHawks

Week 6: vs. Houston Roughnecks

Standings

Staff

Roster

References 

DC
2023 in sports in Washington, D.C.
DC Defenders seasons